Rochester is a city in, and the county seat of, Fulton County, Indiana, United States. The population was 6,218 at the 2010 census.

History
Rochester was laid out in 1835. The founder Alexander Chamberlain named it for his former hometown of Rochester, New York. The Rochester post office was established in 1836.

The Potawatomi Trail of Death came through the town in 1838.

Rochester was incorporated as a city in 1853.

The Lyman M. Brackett House, Fulton County Courthouse, Rochester Downtown Historic District, and John W. Smith House are listed on the National Register of Historic Places. The formerly listed Germany Bridge was located nearby. The Wideman-Gerig Round Barn is in use at the Round Barn Golf Club in Rochester.

Geography

Demographics

2010 census
As of the census of 2010, there were 6,218 people, 2,702 households, and 1,650 families living in the city. The racial makeup of the city was 95.9% White, 0.6% African American, 0.4% Native American, 0.9% Asian, 1.0% from other races, and 1.2% from two or more races. Hispanic or Latino people of any race were 3.4% of the population.

Of the 2,702 households 28.2% had children under the age of 18 living with them, 43.2% were married couples living together, 13.4% had a female householder with no husband present, 4.5% had a male householder with no wife present, and 38.9% were non-families. 33.8% of households were one person and 16.1% were one person aged 65 or older. The average household size was 2.26 and the average family size was 2.84.

The median age was 41.6 years. 22.5% of residents were under the age of 18; 8.4% were between the ages of 18 and 24; 22.9% were from 25 to 44; 26.6% were from 45 to 64; and 19.5% were 65 or older. The gender makeup of the city was 47.9% male and 52.1% female.

2000 census
At the 2000 census there were 6,414 people, 2,757 households, and 1,734 families living in the city. The racial makeup of the city was 96.24% White, 0.59% Native American, 0.45% African American, 0.84% Asian, 0.86% from other races, and 1.01% from two or more races. Hispanic or Latino people of any race were 1.86%.

Of the 2,757 households 26.9% had children under the age of 18 living with them, 49.5% were married couples living together, 9.4% had a female householder with no husband present, and 37.1% were non-families. 32.2% of households were one person and 16.4% were one person aged 65 or older. The average household size was 2.30 and the average family size was 2.90.

The age distribution was 23.6% under the age of 18, 7.8% from 18 to 24, 26.5% from 25 to 44, 22.3% from 45 to 64, and 19.8% 65 or older. The median age was 40 years. For every 100 females, there were 90.2 males. For every 100 females age 18 and over, there were 87.3 males.

The median household income was $33,424 and the median family income  was $41,949. Males had a median income of $31,446 versus $20,796 for females. The per capita income for the city was $18,866. About 7.8% of families and 11.9% of the population were below the poverty line, including 20.4% of those under age 18 and 8.2% of those age 65 or over.

Parks and recreation
Located on the east side of Rochester, Lake Manitou is a popular place in the summer for boating and other water-related activities.  City Park is located on the western side of Rochester, near the high school.

Education
Rochester has a public library, a branch of the Fulton County Public Library.  The Rochester Community School Corporation is housed in Rochester, operating two elementary level schools (Columbia, PK-grade 1 and Riddle, grades 2–4), Rochester Middle School (grades 5–7) and Rochester Community High School (grades 8–12).

Historic structures 
 National Register of Historic Places listings in Fulton County, Indiana
 Rochester Downtown Historic District
 Fulton County Courthouse (Indiana)
 Lyman M. Brackett House
 John W. Smith House

Notable people
 Nicole Gale Anderson, actress
 Jorge Argüello, 2011-13 Ambassador of Argentina to the United States
 Margret Holmes Bates (1844-1927), author
 Otis R. Bowen, fourth United States Secretary of Health and Human Services; born nearby
 John Angus Chamberlain, sculptor
 Thurman C. Crook, one-term U.S. congressman
 Gene DeWeese, science fiction writer; born in Rochester
 Ron Herrell, former member of the Indiana House of Representatives
 Elmo Lincoln, film actor and subject of the biography My Father, Elmo Lincoln: The Original Tarzan
 Ray Mowe, shortstop for the 1913 Brooklyn Dodgers
 Clyde Short, Chairman of the Kansas Democratic Party, 1934-1936
 Stanley Kendall, appeared on the Murphy episode of Dateline's investigative journalism show, To Catch a Predator

References

External links

 City website
 Rochester and Lake Manitou Chamber of Commerce
 Rochester Tourism
 City-Data.com

Cities in Indiana
Cities in Fulton County, Indiana
County seats in Indiana